The 2018–19 Campeonato de Portugal was the sixth season of Portuguese football's new third-tier league, since the merging of the Segunda Divisão and Terceira Divisão in 2013, and the fourth season under the current Campeonato de Portugal title. A total of 72 teams competed in this division, which began in August 2018 and ended in June 2019.

Format
The competition format consists of two stages. In the first stage, the 72 clubs will be divided in four series of 18 teams, according to geographic criteria. In each series, teams play against each other in a home-and-away double round-robin system.

In the second stage, the two best-placed teams of each of four Series will dispute a series of playoff matches to promote to the LigaPro. The two finalists will be promoted directly. The five bottom clubs of each series will be relegated.

Teams

Relegated from the 2017–18 LigaPro:
 União da Madeira
 Sporting B 
 Gil Vicente
 Real

From the 2017–18 Campeonato de Portugal:

 Vizela
 Vilaverdense
 Fafe
 Mirandela
 Merelinense
 São Martinho
 AD Oliveirense
 Pedras Salgadas
 Montalegre
 Torcatense
 Felgueiras 1932
 Sp. Espinho
 Gondomar
 Cesarense
 Cinfães
 Amarante
 Sanjoanense
 Pedras Rubras
 Trofense
 Coimbrões
 União de Leiria
 Lusitano Vildemoinhos
 Benfica Castelo Branco
 Sertanense
 Águeda
 Gafanha
 Anadia
 Marítimo B
 AD Nogueirense
 Oleiros
 Vilafranquense
 Praiense
 Torreense
 Sacavenense
 Fátima
 Loures
 Caldas
 1.º Dezembro
 Sintrense
 Oriental
 Olhanense
 Casa Pia
 Pinhalnovense
 Louletano
 Armacenenses
 Moura
 Olímpico Montijo
 Sp. Ideal

Promoted from the 2017–18 District Championships: 

 Algarve FA: Ferreiras
 Aveiro FA: Lusitânia Lourosa
 Beja FA: Vasco da Gama Vidigueira
 Braga FA: Maria da Fonte and Caçadores das Taipas
 Bragança FA: Mirandês 
 Castelo Branco FA: Alcains
 Coimbra FA: Oliveira do Hospital
 Évora FA: Redondense
 Guarda FA: Sp. Mêda
 Leiria FA: Peniche
 Lisboa FA: Alverca and Santa Iria 
 Madeira FA: Pontassolense 
 Portalegre FA: Mosteirense 
 Porto FA: Paredes and Leça 
 Santarém FA: Mação
 Setúbal FA: Amora
 Viana do Castelo FA: Limianos
 Vila Real FA: Chaves B
 Viseu FA: Sp. Lamego ; Penalva do Castelo
 Liga Meo Azores: Angrense

Notes

Group stage

Serie A

Serie B

Serie C

Serie D

Promotion play-offs

The winners and the runners-up of the 4 Series were qualified to the Promotion Play-offs, where the winning team and the runner-up were promoted to 2019–20 LigaPro.

Bracket

Final

References

Campeonato Nacional de Seniores seasons
3
Por